Dexter McDougle (born April 8, 1991) is a former American football cornerback. He was drafted by the New York Jets in the third round of the 2014 NFL Draft. He played college football at Maryland.

Early years
McDougle played for Stafford Senior High School, where he was a teammate of wide receiver Torrey Smith, as well as at the University of Maryland. He played safety, cornerback, wide receiver and running back. He recorded 97 tackles and six interceptions as a senior in 2008 after missing most of his junior year with an injury. He also caught 48 passes for 885 yards and 11 TDs and rushed for 457 yards and nine scores on 76 carries.

Considered a three-star recruit by Rivals.com, he was rated the 76th best "athlete" prospect of his class.

College career
At Maryland, he was named an Academic All-ACC in his sophomore and senior seasons. McDougle missed the most of his senior year at Maryland due to a fractured shoulder.

Professional career

New York Jets
On May 10, 2014, McDougle was drafted by the New York Jets in the third round (80th overall) of the 2014 NFL Draft.
On August 10, 2014, McDougle tore his ACL at Jets practice and was subsequently placed on the Injured Reserve.

McDougle was waived on September 4, 2016. After clearing waivers, he was signed to the team's practice squad. He was promoted to the active roster on November 12, 2016.

Philadelphia Eagles
On August 27, 2017, McDougle was traded to the Philadelphia Eagles in exchange for Terrence Brooks. On September 2, 2017, he signed a one-year contract extension with the Eagles. During the 2017 season McDougle played 54 defensive snaps (9.3%) and 135 special teams snaps (49.8%) in eight games. Along with special teams, he served as the main backup to slot corner Patrick Robinson but was released on November 13, 2017 to make room for additional depth at linebacker.

New Orleans Saints
On November 21, 2017, McDougle signed with the New Orleans Saints, but was released one week later.

Jacksonville Jaguars
On January 23, 2018, McDougle signed a reserve/future contract with the Jacksonville Jaguars. He was released on August 11, 2018.

Detroit Lions
On August 20, 2018, McDougle was signed by the Detroit Lions. He was released on August 31, 2018.

Philadelphia Eagles (second stint)
On October 16, 2018, McDougle was signed by the Philadelphia Eagles. He was released on November 5, 2018.

Arizona Hotshots
On January 9, 2019, McDougle joined the Arizona Hotshots of the Alliance of American Football. The league ceased operations in April 2019.

Winnipeg Blue Bombers
McDougle signed with the Winnipeg Blue Bombers on February 11, 2020. He was placed on the suspended list on July 9, 2021.

References

External links
New York Jets bio
Maryland Terrapins bio

1991 births
Living people
American football cornerbacks
Arizona Hotshots players
Detroit Lions players
Jacksonville Jaguars players
Maryland Terrapins football players
New Orleans Saints players
New York Jets players
Philadelphia Eagles players
People from Falmouth, Virginia
People from Woodbridge, Virginia
Players of American football from Virginia
Sportspeople from the Washington metropolitan area
Winnipeg Blue Bombers players